Howard Carroll may refer to:

Howard Carroll (newspaperman) (1854–1916), whose home in Tarrytown, New York is now Castle Hotel & Spa
 Howard Joseph Carroll (1902–1960), American prelate of the Roman Catholic Church
Howard Carroll (1924–2017) (Guitar-singer), of the Dixie Hummingbirds
 Howard W. Carroll (born 1942), American lawyer and politician